Persian is a populated place in Jepara Regency, Central Java on the island of Java, Indonesia.

See also
Jepara

References

Villages in Central Java